Tim Bakker (born November 23, 1977) is a former Canadian football offensive lineman who played for the Edmonton Eskimos, BC Lions and Hamilton Tiger-Cats of the Canadian Football League.  He is originally from Oakville, Ontario. He attended the University of Western Ontario, and played centre for the University's football team, the Western Mustangs.

References

External links

1977 births
BC Lions players
Canadian football offensive linemen
Edmonton Elks players
Hamilton Tiger-Cats players
Living people
People from Oakville, Ontario
Western Mustangs football players